Christmas Church may refer to: 
 Christmas Church (Tiraspol), a church in Tiraspol, Transnistria, Moldova
 Christmas Church, a church in Poshtova Square, Kiev, Ukraine